Light rhyme designates a weakened, or unaccented, rhyme that pairs a stressed final syllable with an unstressed one. A rhyme of this kind is also referred to as a wrenched rhyme since the pronunciation of the unstressed syllable is forced into conformity with the stressed syllable of its rhyme mate (eternity/free). Light rhymes are commonly found in music where words are sung with an unnatural emphasis on the final syllable.

Examples 

In the 1917 poem “Preludes” T.S. Eliot used the light rhyme to evoke the uneasiness felt by an individual isolated from society in a modern urban setting.

The winter evening settles down
With smell of steaks in passageways.
Six o'clock.
The burnt-out ends of smoky days.
And now a gusty shower wraps
The grimy scraps
Of withered leaves about your feet
[…]

See also
Rhyme
An Introduction to Rhyme

References 

Rhyme